Katy is a feminine given name. It is a variant spelling of Katie and Katey. Katy may refer to:

In acting

 Katy Jurado, Mexican actress
 Katy Kung, Hong Kong actress
 Katy Kurtzman, American actress
 Katy Wix, British actress

In music
 Katy B (Kathleen Brien), British singer-songwriter
 Katy Carr, British singer-songwriter
 Katy Perry (born 1984), American singer and songwriter
 Katy Rose, American pop singer

In politics
 Katy Clark, British politician and trade union official

In media
 Katy Tur, American broadcast journalist working as correspondent for NBC News

In art

 Katy Deepwell, British feminist art critic and academic

In dance
 Katy Pyle, American dancer and choreographer

In sports
 Katy Spychakov (born 1999), Israeli windsurfer

In fiction

 Katy Carr, heroine of the series of children's book written by Susan Coolidge, notably 
 What Katy Did 
 What Katy Did Next
 Katy Fox, a character from the British soap opera Hollyoaks
 Katy Harris, a character from the British soap opera Coronation Street
Katy Kat, a fictional anthropomorphic blue cat from the Parappa the Rapper games
 Katy Spaghetty, Betty Spaghetty's baby sister
 Katy Armstrong, a character from the British soap opera, Coronation Street

See also
 k.d. lang (born 1961), Canadian musician

References

English feminine given names
English-language feminine given names

nn:Katy